The Joey Heatherton Album is a 1972 album by Joey Heatherton. Her cover of the 1957 Ferlin Husky song "Gone" became a minor hit, but the album didn't do particularly well. Tony Scotti and Tommy Oliver produced and arranged it. It was mixed by Michael Lloyd.

The album was reissued in 2004 on the Hip-O Select label, with 21 bonus tracks comprising Heatherton's singles for the Decca and Coral labels.

Track listing

Original LP

Audio CD with bonus tracks

References

1972 albums